James or Jim Jennings may refer to:
 James Jennings (MP) English landowner and Tory politician
 James Jennings (footballer), English professional footballer 
 James T. Jennings, Union Army soldier and Medal of Honor recipient
 Jim Jennings (American football)
 Jim Jennings (basketball)
 Jim Jennings (filmmaker)
 Jim Jennings (editor)